Dendropsophus garagoensis is a species of frog in the family Hylidae. It is endemic to the eastern slope of the Cordillera Oriental in Boyacá Department, Colombia. Common name Garagoa treefrog has been proposed for it.

Etymology 
The frog has been found in and named after Garagoa, Boyacá. Garagoa means in Muysccubun "behind the hill" or "on the other side of the hill".

Description
Adult males measure  and adult females  in snout–vent length. The head is large and wide. The snout is rounded in profile but blunt and barely rounded in dorsal view. The tympanic annulus is indistinct; the weakly-developed supratympanic fold hides the upper part of the tympanum. The fingers are long, partly webbed, and have rounded discs. The toes are relatively long and webbed. The upper surfaces of the head and body are brown; the flanks are dark brown with bluish-white spots. There are conspicuous yellowish-greenish white dorsolateral and labial bands. The ventral surfaces are dull brown. The iris is copper or occasionally gold.

Habitat and conservation

This species appears to tolerate some habitat modification and is unlikely to be facing substantial threats. It is abundant and its population is believed to be stable. It is not known from protected areas.

References 

garagoensis
Amphibians of the Andes
Amphibians of Colombia
Endemic fauna of Colombia
Altiplano Cundiboyacense
Amphibians described in 1991
Taxonomy articles created by Polbot